Hugh Bostock  (born 25 August 1944) is a British neuroscientist, and Emeritus Professor of Neurophysiology, at University College, London.

Life
He was educated at Charterhouse School and earned a BA from Merton College, Oxford in 1966, and MSc and PhD in 1974 from University of London.

Works

References

External links
http://www.cnmd.ac.uk/MRC_Centre_Members/Hugh_Bostock
http://www.bostock.net/tree/bostgen/names/duff/hugh1944.html

1944 births
Living people
People educated at Charterhouse School
Alumni of Merton College, Oxford
Alumni of the University of London
British neuroscientists
Fellows of the Royal Society
Academics of University College London